Panesthia australis, colloquially called the Australian wood cockroach or the common wood cockroach, is a species of giant cockroach endemic to Australia.

Appearance 
Adults of this species are usually around 3.4 cm long and black, while nymphs vary between 7 and 35 mm in length, the average length being roughly 17 mm. Sexual dimorphism in the species is negligible.

Distribution 
Panesesthia australis is mostly found in Eastern Australia, especially in New South Wales.

Colonies 
Panesthia australis lives in family groups in rotting wood. The walls of their burrows are made of frass.

References 

Cockroaches
Insects of Australia
Insects described in 1865